Album II or Album 2 may refer to:

Album2, photo sharing website
Album II (Loudon Wainwright III album)
Album II (Kem album)